Cable car most commonly refers to the following cable transportation systems:

 Aerial lift, such as aerial cablecars and gondola lifts, in which the vehicle is suspended in the air from a cable
 Aerial cablecar
 Chairlift
 Gondola lift
 Bicable gondola lift
 Tricable gondola lift
 Cable railway, in which the vehicle rests on rails or a road.
 Cable car (railway), a type of cable transportation used for mass transit

Cable car may also refer to:

 Cable Car (cocktail), a modern variant on the sidecar
 "Over My Head (Cable Car)", a 2005 song by The Fray on the album How to Save a Life
 "Cable Car", a 1971 song by The Hollies on the album Distant Light

See also

 Cable ferry
 Gibraltar Cable Car
 Reaction ferry
 San Francisco cable car system
 Ski lift
 Skyline logging
 Surface lift
 Transporter bridge
 Zip-line